Iloilo Scholastic Academy (ISA) is a K–12 co-educational private school in Mandurriao, Iloilo City, Iloilo, Philippines. It was established in 2004 by a group of Ilonggo businessmen who wanted to have a school that aims to impress the Filipino and Chinese cultures in a new generation.

References

External links 
 

Schools in Iloilo City
High schools in Iloilo
Chinese-language schools in the Philippines
Educational institutions established in 2004
2004 establishments in the Philippines